Michael McCann OAM (born 26 September 1977) is a field hockey striker from Sydney, Australia, who won the gold medal with the Australia national field hockey team at the 2004 Summer Olympics in Athens. He was included in the national squad for the  Sultan Azlan Shah Cup in 2001 after an impressive national league season netted him the top goal scorer's award.

He retired from international hockey in 2007 after playing 165 games and scoring 72 goals.

His nickname in the younger days was "10 cents".  This came about because every time he scored a goal his aunty would give him 10 cents as a reward.  After at least 3 games of hockey on a weekend, the rewards were massive.

International senior tournaments
 2002 – World Cup, Kuala Lumpur (2nd place)
 2002 – Commonwealth Games, Manchester (1st place)
 2002 – Champions Trophy, Cologne (5th place)
 2003 – Champions Trophy, Amstelveen (2nd place)
 2004 – Olympic Games, Athens (1st place)
 2005 – Champions Trophy, Chennai (1st place)
 2006 – Commonwealth Games, Melbourne (1st place)
 2006 – Champions Trophy, Terrassa (4th place)
 2006 – World Cup, Mönchengladbach (2nd place)

References

External links
 

1977 births
Living people
Australian male field hockey players
Male field hockey forwards
Olympic field hockey players of Australia
Field hockey players at the 2002 Commonwealth Games
2002 Men's Hockey World Cup players
Field hockey players at the 2004 Summer Olympics
Field hockey players at the 2006 Commonwealth Games
2006 Men's Hockey World Cup players
Olympic gold medalists for Australia
Commonwealth Games gold medallists for Australia
Recipients of the Medal of the Order of Australia
Place of birth missing (living people)
Olympic medalists in field hockey
Medalists at the 2004 Summer Olympics
Commonwealth Games medallists in field hockey
Medallists at the 2002 Commonwealth Games
Medallists at the 2006 Commonwealth Games